The Coma Filament is a galaxy filament. The filament contains the Coma Supercluster of galaxies and forms a part of the CfA2 Great Wall.

See also
 Abell catalogue
 Large-scale structure of the universe
 Supercluster

References

Galaxy filaments
Large-scale structure of the cosmos
Astronomical objects discovered in 1985